Choi Hyo-eun (born 2 March 1994) is a South Korean actress and model.

Biography and career
Choi studied theatre and film at Cheongju University. Choi Hyo Eun is an actress under the artist management company Star Iyagi Entertainment. She started her acting career in 2007 when she was 15 years old with the MBC drama Assorted Gems.  In 2011, she continued to appear on the small screen with the movie called All My Love.  Two years later Choi Hyo Eun got her first film role through Fists of Legend. She also starred in the popular drama Princess Aurora as a supporting actor.  In 2014, she made a strong impression on the audience when she appeared in five consecutive films on television, notably My Love from the Star with SBS's You're All Surrounded.  In 2015 she appeared in the popular drama Who Are You: School 2015 as Hyo-eun, she was praised for her acting. Choi also appeared in Fight for My Way and she played a supporting role and she also acted in the famous and popular drama, Rain or Shine.

Filmography

Television

Film

Ambassadorship
 2020 appointed as Public Relations Ambassadors for the International Peace Film Festival

References

External links
 Profile (daum)
 Star Iyagi Entertainment
 Jiho Ent Profile
 

1994 births
Living people
21st-century South Korean actresses
South Korean female models
South Korean television actresses
South Korean film actresses